Aspartylglucosaminuria (AGU) is an inherited disease that is characterized by a decline in mental functioning, accompanied by an increase in skin, bone and joint issues.

The disease is caused by a defect in an enzyme known as aspartylglucosaminidase. This enzyme plays a significant role in our bodies because it aids in breaking down certain sugars (for example, oligosaccharides) that are attached to specific proteins (for example, glycoproteins). Aspartylglucosaminuria itself is characterized as a lysosomal disease because it does deal with inadequate activity in an enzyme's function. Aspartylglucosaminidase functions to break down glycoproteins. These proteins are most abundant in the tissues of the body and in the surfaces of major organs, such as the liver, spleen, thyroid and nerves. When glycoproteins are not broken down, aspartylglucosaminidase backs up in the lysosomes along with other substances. This backup causes progressive damage to the tissues and organs.

Signs and symptoms
At birth, there is no sign that a child will develop symptoms of aspartylglucosaminuria. Typically, signs and symptoms become apparent between two and four years of age and become progressively worse as the individual ages. The following signs and symptoms  may appear:
　
 Individuals are more prone to respiratory infections
 Development of scoliosis
 Seizures or difficulty with movement
 Skin and joints may become loose
 Facial features change progressively; this may include:
 thickening of the skin
 features becoming more prominent
 large head
 broad lower jaw
 short, broad nose
 rounded cheeks
 Progression of developmental and mental disabilities, including:
 progressive loss of speech
 decrease in mental functioning
 before school age, concentration lowers
 development continues, but becomes slower than usual
 An intellectual peak occurs in the mid-teens and allows a plateau for the disease. Once an individual hits the age of 25–30 the decrease begins again, including:
 learned skills become lost which result in severe learning disabilities
 motor skills deteriorate
 individuals become less mobile and more dependent
(Children are physically uncoordinated, but remain able to play sports and do everyday activities until they reach adulthood.)
 During the first year of life inguinal and umbilical hernias are common.
 Less severe symptoms include:
 enlargement of the spleen and liver
 diarrhea
 People with aspartylglucosaminuria may have lower than average height, because they tend to go through puberty earlier.
 Epilepsy may develop in adulthood.
 Finnish studies have shown that life expectancy is shorter than average.

Genetics
Aspartylglucosaminuria is an autosomal recessive genetic condition that is inherited from both parents. The AGU patient is born with two copies of the mutated AGA gene. One copy comes from the mother’s egg and the other copy comes from the father’s sperm. In order to develop aspartylglucosaminuria, the individual must inherit changes in both of his AGU genes (autonomic recessive inheritance). When a person receives one changed form of the gene AGU from one of the parents, the individual is then classified as a carrier.

Diagnosis
In order to be diagnosed with AGU an individual takes a urine test, which will show indication of an increased amount of aspartylglucosamin being secreted. The confirmation of the diagnosis of aspartylglucosaminuria requires a blood test. This helps show if the enzyme aspartylglucosaminidase is present or partially absent. A skin simple will also show the amount of aspartylglucosaminidase present.

Pre-natal diagnosis
When families have a child who has already been diagnosed with AGU, they have the option to observe the enzyme's activity that codes for AGU in future pregnancy, to help determine if the next child will also have a positive diagnosis for aspartylglucosaminuria.

Treatment
No treatment is available to cure or slow down the progression of aspartylglucosaminuria. Bone marrow transplants have been conducted in hope that the bone marrow will produce the missing enzyme. The results of the tests thus far have shown to be inconclusive.

Preventions/interventions to signs and symptoms

Since ear infections and respiratory infections are common for children diagnosed with aspartylglucosaminuria, it is best to have regular checkups for both the ears and the respiratory tract.

Extreme sensitivity to the sun’s rays may develop; the best way to protect an individual diagnosed with aspartylglucosaminuria is to have them wear sunglasses, hats or caps to protect their eyes.Epilepsy and insomnia can both be treated with medication.

It will be beneficial to children who are diagnosed with AGU to receive an education from a school with special teaching.

Habilitation
The process of habilitation for individuals diagnosed with AGU needs to be established in their early stages of life. The team for habilitation should include professionals who are experienced in disabilities and the effects that having a disability can have on everyday life. Habilitation will include assessments, assistance with the choice of aids, and information concerning disabilities and counseling.

Prognosis
Individuals with AGU typically have normal development in infancy. Around the age of 2–4 years, they begin showing signs of developmental delay, but development is still progressing. Initial symptoms may present as clumsiness and/or speech delay. Individuals with AGU also show increased upper respiratory infections. Development continues until about puberty; however, an individual at 13–16 years of age typically shows mental and motor development similar to a 5-6 year old. Around puberty, a gradual decline in mental abilities and motor skills occurs. This progressive decline continues until about age 25–28, when rapid impairment of abilities occurs, resulting in severe intellectual disability.

Epidemiology
Aspartylglucosaminuria is estimated to affect 1 in 18,500 people in Finland. This condition is less common in other countries, but the incidence is unknown. Even though this disease can occur in various races and ethnicities, another study  backed this finding up by stating that 1 in 26,000 people in Finland had the disease and that 1 in 18,000 were carriers.

After trisomy 21 and fragile X syndrome, this is the most frequent multiple congenital anomaly/intellectual disability syndrome in Finland.

See also
 Inborn error of metabolism

References

External links 
 

Glycoprotein metabolism disorders
Autosomal recessive disorders
Rare diseases